Sainte-Marguerite is a parish municipality in La Nouvelle-Beauce Regional County Municipality in the Chaudière-Appalaches region of Quebec, Canada. Its population is 1,107 as of the Canada 2011 Census. It is named after Marguerite Marcoux, who gave part of the land she owned in 1830 for the construction of a church.

Demographics 

References

Commission de toponymie du Québec
Ministère des Affaires municipales, des Régions et de l'Occupation du territoire

Parish municipalities in Quebec
Incorporated places in Chaudière-Appalaches
Canada geography articles needing translation from French Wikipedia